Hirshman is a surname. Notable people with the surname include:

 Elliot Hirshman (born 1961), American psychologist
 Linda Hirshman (born 1944), American lawyer and author
 Louis Hirshman (1905–1986), American artist

See also
 Hirschman, surname
 Herschmann, surname